ConSequences is an album by American jazz trumpeter Raphe Malik,  which was recorded live at the 2nd Fire in the Valley Festival in 1997 and released on the Eremite label. He leads a quartet with tenor saxophonist Sabir Mateen, bassist William Parker and drummer Denis Charles in one of his last recorded performances.

Reception

In his review for AllMusic, Thom Jurek states "Malik is an improviser concerned with the outer limits, but not at the expense of what has evolved into Western musical architecture. He picked the right band because the versatility of each man in this ensemble is well-documented."

The Penguin Guide to Jazz notes "although this is a chance to hear Denis Charles in one of his final recordings, and Malik and Mateen play some vociferous solos, a strong live performance transfers rather uneasily to CD."

The All About Jazz review by John Sharpe says "The individual components are marvellous but it is the group interplay which elevates this music into the top drawer.
Malik is a powerful trumpeter full of heraldic fanfares, excoriating runs and broad smears, in addition to his artful composition."

In his review for JazzTimes Peter Margasak states "Recorded with a group of veterans who understand that raw emotionalism means little without structure or context, the album seethes with white-hot expressionism, but in most cases such displays are outgrowths of the leader's memorable, surprisingly lyrical themes."

Track listing
All compositions by Raphe Malik
 "Dominant Predicate" – 11:11
 "The Gift" – 19:10
 "Ditch Weed" – 10:48 
 "3X Twice" – 9:27
 "Ghost Dance" – 6:32
 "GG" – 8:44

Personnel
Raphe Malik – trumpet
Sabir Mateen – alto sax
William Parker – bass
Denis Charles - drums

References

 
1999 live albums
Raphe Malik live albums
Eremite Records live albums